Little Thornapple River may refer to:

Two rivers in Michigan, both part of the Thornapple River system
 Little Thornapple River (Coldwater River)
 Little Thornapple River (Eaton County)

Two rivers in Wisconsin, both tributaries of the Thornapple River
 Little Thornapple River (Rusk County), rises in Sawyer County but mostly in Rusk
 Little Thornapple River (Sawyer County), entirely in Sawyer County

See also
 Thornapple River (disambiguation)